The 2022–23 EuroCup Basketball season is the 21st season of Euroleague Basketball's secondary level professional club basketball tournament. It is the 15th season since it was renamed from the ULEB Cup to the EuroCup, and the seventh season under the title sponsorship name of 7DAYS.

Team allocation 
A total of 20 teams from 13 leagues participate in the 2022–23 EuroCup Basketball.

Teams 
League positions after playoffs of the previous season shown in parentheses.

Notes

Round and draw dates 
The schedule of the competition was as follows.

Draw 
The draw was held on 8 July 2022 in Barcelona, Spain.

The 20 teams were drawn into two groups of 10, with the restriction that teams from the same league could not be drawn against each other, except when there were more than two teams from the same league participating in the regular season. For the draw, the teams were seeded into 10 pots, in accordance with the Club Ranking, based on their performance in European competitions during a three-year period and the lowest possible position that any club from that league can occupy in the draw is calculated by adding the results of the worst performing team from each league.

The fixtures were decided after the draw, using a computer draw not shown to public, with the following match sequence:

Note: Positions for scheduling do not use the seeding pots, e.g., Team 1 is not necessarily the team from Pot 1 in the draw.

There were scheduling restrictions: for example, teams from the same city in general were not scheduled to play at home on the same round (to avoid them playing at home on the same day or on consecutive days, due to logistics and crowd control).

Regular season 

The 20 teams are divided into two groups of 10 teams each. In each group, teams will play against each other home-and-away in a round-robin format for a total of 18 games played by each team. The top eight teams from each group will advance to the playoffs, while the last two teams from each group will be eliminated. The regular season started on 18 October 2022 and will end on 5 April 2023.

Group A

Standings

Results

Group B

Standings

Results

Awards

MVP of the Round

Regular season

See also 
2022–23 EuroLeague
2022–23 Basketball Champions League
2022–23 FIBA Europe Cup

References

External links 
Official website

EuroCup Basketball seasons
2022–23 EuroCup Basketball
 
Current basketball seasons